The Orange Park Elementary School is a historic school in Orange Park, Florida. It is located at 1401 Plainfield Avenue. On July 15, 1998, it was added to the U.S. National Register of Historic Places. Orange Park Elementary was established in 1927 and so it is the oldest school in Clay County.

References

External links
 Clay County listings at National Register of Historic Places
 Orange Park Elementary at Florida's Office of Cultural and Historical Programs

National Register of Historic Places in Clay County, Florida
Public elementary schools in Florida
Educational institutions established in 1927
1927 establishments in Florida